Run & Hide is the second single taken from Tear the Signs Down, the third studio album by Welsh band The Automatic. The single was announced on BBC Radio Wales. Run & Hide was released on 1 March 2010, 1 week prior to Tear the Signs Down on 8 March 2010.

Music & lyrics
The song is the first single to feature Paul Mullen providing lead vocals, it also uses a string arrangement, and was originally titled "Parasol".

Release
The song was performed acoustically with "Steve McQueen", "Interstate" and a cover of "She Wolf" on Alan Thompson's BBC Radio Wales evening show. The song was officially premiered on BBC Radio 1 at 8:55 PM 19 January 2010 on Zane Lowes Show.

Music video
The music video for Run & Hide was shot at the live music venue Cardiff Coal Exchange on 5 January 2010 and features the band playing against an LED light rig and in a cellar, pictures of the shoot were posted on Facebook and Twitter.

External links
theautomatic.co.uk The Automatic's official website
The Automatic on Facebook
 on YouTube

References

The Automatic songs
Songs written by James Frost
Songs written by Iwan Griffiths
Songs written by Robin Hawkins
Songs written by Alex Pennie
2010 singles
2010 songs
EMI Records singles